The 2013 CAF Confederation Cup Final was the final of the 2013 CAF Confederation Cup, the 10th edition of the CAF Confederation Cup, Africa's secondary club football competition organised by the Confederation of African Football (CAF).

The final was contested in two-legged home-and-away format between CS Sfaxien of Tunisia and TP Mazembe of the Democratic Republic of the Congo. The first leg was hosted by CS Sfaxien at the Stade Olympique de Radès in Radès on 23 November 2013, while the second leg was hosted by TP Mazembe at the Stade TP Mazembe in Lubumbashi on 30 November 2013. The winners earned the right to play in the 2014 CAF Super Cup against the winners of the 2013 CAF Champions League.

CS Sfaxien won the first leg 2–0 and despite losing the second leg 2–1, they were crowned CAF Confederation Cup champions for a record third time.

Background
CS Sfaxien had previously reached three CAF Confederation Cup finals, winning twice (2007, 2008) and losing once (2010), while this was the first CAF Confederation Cup final for TP Mazembe.

Road to the final

Note: In all results below, the score of the finalists is given first.

Notes

Rules
The final was played on a home-and-away two-legged basis. If the sides were level on aggregate after the second leg, the away goals rule was applied, and if still level, the tie proceeded directly to a penalty shoot-out (no extra time was played).

Matches

First leg

Second leg

References

External links

Final
2013
CS Sfaxien matches
TP Mazembe matches
Sports competitions in Radès
21st century in Radès
International club association football competitions hosted by the Democratic Republic of the Congo